William Ross Macdonald  (December 25, 1891 – May 28, 1976), served as the 21st Lieutenant Governor of Ontario from 1968 to 1974, and as 22nd Speaker of the House of Commons of Canada from 1949 to 1953.

Early life 
Macdonald was born in Toronto, Ontario, to a dry goods merchant who had immigrated from Scotland. He went on to study law at the University of Toronto and the Osgoode Hall Law School. Upon completion, he practised law in Brantford, Ontario, and served with the 2nd Cycle Corps and 4th Battalion of the Canadian Expeditionary Force in the First World War.

In 1921, Macdonald married Muriel Whittaker.

Political career 
Macdonald sought Liberal Party nomination to run for election to the House of Commons of Canada for the 1926 election, but lost the nomination by a single vote. He won the nomination for the Brantford riding in the next election, but lost the election. Macdonald was elected in the 1935 election. He served as Member of Parliament (MP) until 1953.

During World War II, Macdonald was a staunch supporter of conscription. His position is made clear in this wartime quote taken from a Canadian newspaper, "There is a victory to be won and that can be accomplished only by every Canadian taking part." After the war, he served as Deputy Speaker (1945–1949) and then as Speaker of the House of Commons (1949–1953).

While serving as Speaker of the House of Commons Macdonald made a famous ruling, banning musical instruments from being played in the Chamber, on June 3, 1950. The ban came about after Daniel McIvor MP for Fort William played a flute while waiting for a vote call.

In 1953, Governor General Vincent Massey, on the advice of Prime Minister Louis St. Laurent, appointed Macdonald to the Senate of Canada, where he became Leader of the Government in the Canadian Senate and a minister without portfolio in the Canadian Cabinet. From 1954 until the Liberal government's defeat in the 1957 election, Macdonald served as Solicitor General of Canada.

With the defeat of the Liberals, he became Leader of the Opposition in the Canadian Senate, and served again as Government Leader when the Liberals returned to power in 1963. He retired from the Cabinet in 1964. From 1964 to 1972, he was the second Chancellor of Waterloo Lutheran University.
 
Governor General Roland Michener, on the advice of Lester Pearson, appointed Macdonald to serve as Lieutenant Governor from 1968 to 1974. In this role, he was involved with many service groups, such as the Canadian Order of Foresters and the Kiwanis Club.

In 1974, he was made an Officer of the Order of Canada. The Ontario School for the Blind in Brantford was renamed the W. Ross Macdonald School in his honour.

He died in Toronto in 1976.

Freemasonry 
William Macdonald was a devoted Freemason initiated on March 17, 1917 at the Doric Lodge No. 121 in Brantford, Ontario.

References

External links
 

1891 births
1976 deaths
Lawyers in Ontario
Canadian King's Counsel
Canadian senators from Ontario
Canadian university and college chancellors
Lieutenant Governors of Ontario
Liberal Party of Canada MPs
Liberal Party of Canada senators
Members of the King's Privy Council for Canada
Members of the United Church of Canada
Officers of the Order of Canada
Politicians from Toronto
Canadian people of Scottish descent
Speakers of the House of Commons of Canada
University of Toronto alumni
Solicitors General of Canada